Mohammed Al Ammari (born 10 December 1965) is a Qatari football coach and a former midfielder who played for Qatar in the 1984 Asian Cup. He also competed in the men's tournament at the 1984 Summer Olympics.

He started off in Al Sadd's youth teams in 1977, before moving to their first team and quickly becoming a key player in 1983. He had to retire from playing football at the age of 26 due to injury, and started studying to be a coach. He trained Al Sadd's youth teams in 1999, and was also assistant coach on multiple occasions, to head coaches Rabah Madjer, Džemaludin Mušović, René Meulensteen and Bora Milutinović. After the departure of Milutinović, he took up the head coach position in October 2005. He was the head coach until May 2006. He would later become the first ever coach of El Jaish, coaching the team from 2007 until 2011, when he was sacked after winning the team promotion to the Qatar Stars League.

References

External links
Stats

Qatar international footballers
Qatari football managers
1965 births
Living people
Qatar Stars League players
Al Sadd SC players
Qatari footballers
1984 AFC Asian Cup players
1988 AFC Asian Cup players
Al Sadd SC managers
El Jaish SC managers
Association football midfielders
Olympic footballers of Qatar
Footballers at the 1984 Summer Olympics